William Thomas McCarthy (April 11, 1882 – May 29, 1939) was a professional baseball pitcher. He appeared in one game in Major League Baseball, pitching two innings in one game for the Boston Beaneaters in 1906. In that game he gave up two earned runs on two hits and three walks.

Sources

 Stats at Baseball-Almanac

Major League Baseball pitchers
Boston Beaneaters players
Baseball players from Massachusetts
Fordham Rams baseball players
1882 births
1939 deaths